Nicoline van der Sijs (born 1 April 1955) is a Dutch linguist and etymologist who is Professor of Historical Dutch Linguistics at Radboud University Nijmegen.

Biography
Nicoline van der Sijs was born in Heerlen on 1 April 1955. She received a master's degree in Slavistics from the University of Utrecht in 1979, and a Ph.D. in Dutch historical linguistics from Leiden University in 2001. On January 1, 2013, van der Sijs was appointed Professor of Historical Dutch Linguistics at Radboud University Nijmegen.

References

1955 births
Etymologists
Leiden University alumni
Linguists from the Netherlands
Living people
Academic staff of Radboud University Nijmegen
Slavists
Utrecht University alumni